Oleksandr Volodymyrovych Kalitov (born 29 September 1993) is a Ukrainian professional football defender and midfielder.

Career
Kalitov is a product of Chornomorets Odesa academy. He made his debut for Chornomorets Odeas in the Ukrainian Premier League game against Volyn Lutsk on 8 March 2015.

References

External links
 
 

1993 births
Living people
Footballers from Odesa
Ukrainian footballers
Association football defenders
FC Dnister Ovidiopol players
FC Metalurh Donetsk players
FC Chornomorets Odesa players
FC Real Pharma Odesa players
FC Nyva Vinnytsia players
Ukrainian Premier League players
Ukrainian First League players
Ukrainian Second League players